Txomin Juaristi Arrieta (born 20 July 1995) is a Spanish cyclist, who currently rides for UCI ProTeam .

Major results
2017
 2nd Overall Volta a Portugal do Futuro
2019
 5th Klasika Primavera
 6th Overall Volta ao Alentejo

References

External links

1995 births
Living people
Spanish male cyclists
Cyclists from the Basque Country (autonomous community)
Sportspeople from Biscay
People from Lea-Artibai